The Ungane Islands are an archipelago of three small islands lying 4 miles (6 km) west-northwest of Hamnenabben Head in the east part of Lutzow-Holm Bay.  They were first mapped by Norwegian cartographers from air photos taken by the Lars Christensen Expedition, 1936–37, and named Ungane (the young ones).

See also 
 List of antarctic and sub-antarctic islands

Islands of Queen Maud Land
Prince Harald Coast